North Fall is a Danish lo fi indie rock project founded by singer/songwriter and producer Anders Belling. It consists of Belling and a group of collaborators all based in Copenhagen, Denmark.

In 2014 North Fall released their debut album 'Outside It's Growing Light" to a 5/6 review in Denmark's biggest music magazine GAFFA.

References

External links 
Official sites
 The official North Fall Facebook page
 The official North Fall Soundcloud page
 The official North Fall Twitter page

Danish rock music groups